Joseph Pondelik (May 8, 1902 – January 23, 1965) was an American football player.  

Pondelik was born in 1902. He played college football for the Chicago Maroons football team of the University of Chicago from 1922 to 1924, and was a consensus first-team selection to the 1924 College Football All-America Team.  In naming Pondelik as an All-American, Walter Eckersall wrote that Pondelik was "considered the best guard who ever played on one of Stagg's elevens."

In March 1926, Pondelik was married to Margaret Leigh, winner of the "Miss Chicago" contest.

Pondelik lived for 52 years in Cicero, Illinois, and was the founder of Joseph Pondelik Jr. Construction Company. He was also a pilot and hunter. He died in 1965 at age 62.

References

1902 births
1965 deaths
American football guards
Chicago Maroons football players
All-American college football players
Players of American football from Chicago